Dorcadion danczenkoi is a species of beetle in the family Cerambycidae. It was described by Mikhail Leontievich Danilevsky in 1996. It is known from Afghanistan, Azerbaijan, and Iran.

References

danczenkoi
Beetles described in 1996